Dottie or Dotty is a feminine given name or nickname (most often a short form of Dorothy) which may refer to:

People
 Dottie Alexander (born 1972), keyboardist for of Montreal, an American indie pop band
 Dotty Attie (born 1938), American painter and printmaker
 Dottie Wiltse Collins (1923–2008), American pitcher in the All-American Girls Professional Baseball League
 Dottie Green (1921–1992), American player in the All-American Girls Professional Baseball League
 Dottie Hunter (1916–2005), Canadian player in the All-American Girls Professional Baseball League
 Dotty Lynch (1945–2014), American academic, journalist and political pollster
 Dotty Mack, star of the 1950s American variety television series The Dotty Mack Show
 Dottie Martin (born 1937), First Lady of North Carolina
 Dottie Peoples (born 1950), American gospel singer
 Dottie Pepper (born 1965), American golfer (as Dottie Mochrie) and television golf broadcaster
 Dottie Rambo (1934–2008), American gospel singer and songwriter born Joyce Reba Luttrell
 Art and Dotty Todd (born 1913), American husband-and-wife singing duo
 Dottie West (1932–1991), American country music singer and songwriter
 Dottie Potter Zenaty, field hockey coach at Springfield College, Massachusetts, from 1970 to 2003
 Amplify Dot (born 1988), British broadcaster, also known as Dotty

Stage name
 Dottie Danger, a stage name of American singer Belinda Carlisle (born 1958)
 Another stage name of English rapper and broadcaster Amplify Dot

Fictional characters
 Dotty Cotton, on the UK soap opera EastEnders
 Dotty, Leah’s stuffed elephant she got from the fair in Shimmer and Shine
 Dotty, title character of Dotty Dripple, an American comic strip (1944–74)
 Dotty, title character of Dear Dotty, a British 1954 television series
 Dotty, a rabbit villager in the video game series Animal Crossing

Animals
 Dottie, a fish in the American television series FishCenter Live
 Dotty, a donkey awarded the PDSA Certificate for Animal Bravery or Devotion in 2011

See also
 Dot (given name)

Hypocorisms
Feminine given names